Black Box is a 2021 mystery thriller film directed by Yann Gozlan. It is a co-production between France and Belgium. The film stars Pierre Niney. The film had its world premiere at the Alliance Française French Film Festival on 5 March 2021.

Premise 
Matthieu, a talented young black box analyst, is tasked with investigating a mysterious deadly plane crash.

Cast

Production

Development 
Director and co-writer Yann Gozlan is a civil aviation enthusiast and had wanted to make a film on the subject for a long time: "This universe, incredibly cinematic from my perspective, with colossal financial stakes, where divergent interests coexist (aircraft manufacturers, airlines, pilots...), seemed to me like an original and exciting setting for a film".

In preparation for his role, Pierre Niney spent several weeks working alongside agents from the Bureau of Enquiry and Analysis for Civil Aviation Safety (BEA): "There, I ended up finding an investigator with a profile similar to that of Mathieu. From there, as usual, I did a kind of journalistic work: I shadowed him, I spoke with him and asked his permission to film him so that I could find inspiration in his gestures, his way of working and his speed on the computer. The job of an acoustician is very technical, it was important to be able to replicate the details with precision".

Filming 
Filming began on 9 September 2019 in the Paris region. In October 2019, filming was reported to have taken place at Epinay Studios in Épinay-sur-Seine. That same month, the city hall of Cergy was used as a production space.

Release 
The film had its world premiere at the 32nd Alliance Française French Film Festival in Australia on 5 March 2021. It was theatrically released in France by Studiocanal on 8 September 2021.

Reception

Box office 
Black Box grossed $0 in North America, and $9.4 million in France for a worldwide total of $9.7 million.

Critical response 
On Rotten Tomatoes, the film holds an approval rating of 94% based on 18 reviews, with an average rating of 7.3/10.

Le Monde published a positive review of the film, writing that "if the nature of the conspiracy that the hero faces is perhaps a little too obvious, the film is nevertheless distinguished by the qualities of a narrative that skillfully keeps the viewer in suspense".

Awards and nominations

References

External links 
 

2021 films
2020s French films
2020s French-language films
2020s mystery thriller films
2021 thriller films
French mystery thriller films
Belgian mystery thriller films
French-language Belgian films
StudioCanal films
France 2 Cinéma films
Films about aviation accidents or incidents
Films set in France
Films shot in Île-de-France
Films shot in Val-d'Oise
Films shot at Epinay Studios